Oskari Sallinen (born 22 June 2001) is a professional Finnish football midfielder who plays for Ekenäs IF.

Career

JJK
He made his debut for JJK on 15 June 2017 in their Veikkausliiga 4–0 loss to HJK Helsinki.

Loan to FC Groningen
In the summer of 2017, Sallinen was loaned out to Groningen. Sallinen played for the club's U17 and U19 squads. The contract was a 1-year loan deal with the option to buy. The option was exercised and he spent two additional years in Groningen's youth teams.

References

External links 
 

2001 births
Living people
Finnish footballers
Finland youth international footballers
Association football midfielders
JJK Jyväskylä players
Kuopion Palloseura players
Ekenäs IF players
Veikkausliiga players
Kakkonen players
Ykkönen players
Finnish expatriate footballers
Expatriate footballers in the Netherlands
Finnish expatriate sportspeople in the Netherlands